Tonga Red Cross Society (TRCS) was established in 1961 and it has its headquarters in Nukualofa.

External links 
Official Tonga Red Cross Society Facebook account
Official Tonga Red Cross Society Twitter account

Red Cross and Red Crescent national societies
1961 establishments in Tonga
Organizations established in 1961
Medical and health organisations based in Tonga